François Gustave Théophile Seyrig (19 February 1843 to 5 July 1923) was a German engineer, best known for designing bridges.

On 6 October 1868, he founded Eiffel and Company with Gustave Eiffel. Seyrig contributed to the Eiffel and Company project to build the Maria Pia Bridge in Porto, Portugal, which was finished in 1877. Seyrig presented a paper on the bridge to the Société des Ingénieurs Civils in 1878.

Later he worked for the Belgian firm Société Willebroeck in Brussels, and won the competition to build the Dom Luís I Bridge (also in Porto), beating the Eiffel proposal. He began construction in 1881 and the bridge was finished in 1886.

Works
 Maria Pia Bridge
 Dom Luís I Bridge
 Neuvial Viaduct
 Rouzat Viaduct

Writings
  Seyrig, Théophile. Pont d. Luiz I. à Porto, Librairie centrales des chemins de fer, Paris, 1884
  Seyrig, Théophile. Éléments de statique graphique appliquée aux constructions, Baudry, Paris, 1886; pp. 392

References

 
  
  (570 KB)

Bibliography
  Ponte Maria Pia, Ordem dos Engenheiros, Região Norte, 2005

1843 births
1923 deaths
Engineers from Berlin
German civil engineers